Aylesbury is a settlement in the Canterbury region of New Zealand. It can be found between the towns of Rolleston and Kirwee.

The epicentre of the 7.1 magnitude Canterbury earthquake on 4 September 2010, was very close to Aylesbury and the largest land surface fractures were in this locality.

References 

Selwyn District
Populated places in Canterbury, New Zealand